PCBoard (PCB) was a bulletin board system (BBS) application first introduced for DOS in 1983 by Clark Development Company. Clark Development was founded by Fred Clark. PCBoard was one of the first commercial BBS packages for DOS systems, and was considered one of the "high end" packages during the rapid expansion of BBS systems in the early 1990s. Like many BBS companies, the rise of the Internet starting around 1994 led to serious downturns in fortunes, and Clark Development went bankrupt in 1997. Most PCB sales were of two-line licenses; additional line licenses (in ranges of 5, 10, 25, 50, 100, 250 and 1000) were also available.

A native 32-bit IBM OS/2 version became also available with PCB V15.22 and higher. There were also a few tools available for PCBoard, which were specifically developed for the OS/2 2.0 and OS/2 Warp operating system.

Multinode support
PCBoard supported the 16C550 UARTs (universal asynchronous receiver transmitter), such as 16550 UART ("Fifo"), 16554 UART and 16650 UART, which made it possible to run multiple nodes of the BBS on a single (multitasking) computer using either using IBM OS/2 or the DOS multitasking tool DESQview in combination with the memory manager QEMM. Some sysops tried to run PCBoard on the (then) new Windows 95 operating system by Microsoft and reported mixed results. Stability was critical for a BBS, which was usually running 24/7, and the early version of the Microsoft 32-bit operating system lacked it. Windows 95 was never officially supported by CDC.

Standard PCs then and today have only one or two (if any) serial ports (COM ports), which are needed to connect an external modem to a computer. This made multiport cards like the G-Tek "BlackBoard", "BBS550" or "SmartCard" and the "DigiCard" by Digi International popular among sysops. Other options were internal multi-modem cards and multiple computers connected by local area network.

PCBoard also supports ISDN (Integrated Services Digital Network) and Telnet access via the Internet. The open source terminal emulator SyncTERM, available for Win32, Linux, FreeBSD, NetBSD, OpenBSD, Solaris and Mac OS X can be used for example to connect to the few remaining PCBoard BBS installations that are connected to the Internet.

Multi-BBS networks
Starting in 1988, the RelayNet, also known as RIME for RelayNet International Mail Exchange, allowed BBS's running PCBoard to join a network that exchanged messages with other BBS's in a system similar to the older FidoNet.

History
The first version of PCBoard was released in 1983.

Clark Development Company (CDC) pioneered the FILE ID.DIZ format as well as a powerful scripting language (PPL), which supported modifications and to a large degree replacement of most standard commands and processes. A compiled interpreter script written in PPL was called PPE (PCBoard Programming Executable). PPEs were generated by the PCBoard Programming Language Compiler (PPLC), which was an optional tool provided by Clark Development Company and was also available for purchase as stand alone tool. It was less than $100 by itself and less than $50 in combination with any BBS license. This allowed programmers to develop PPEs for PCBoard without having to purchase a PCBoard BBS license.

Also optional and available by itself were the printed PCBoard manual and the printed PPLC reference handbook.

The script language was introduced with version 15.0 and made this version of PCBoard even more successful than PCBoard V14.5.

Various door programs were in use, including Sam Smith's Prodoor, which added a full screen editor and other features which were later included in PCBoard itself.

The script language PPL and PPE's which became more and more available, increased the popularity of PCBoard and emerged by the mid nineties as the de facto-standard BBS system for warez BBS on the IBM PC. The warez BBSs used mostly pirated versions of the BBS software and thus did not appear in any official sales or usage statistic for the software.

Despite the high price tag Clark Development Company sold more than 50,000 PCBoard licenses by 1995.

The last full release of PCBoard by Clark Development Company was version 15.3 in September 1996.

Clark Technologies, a division of Clark Development Company announced on July 29, 1996 the availability of source code and OEM licenses for the PCBoard BBS software.

The final release was 15.4 beta, which had a one-month trial period. Later, the lead software engineer from Clark Development Company released information on how to bypass the trial period timeout; the timeout had been inserted as a reminder and had not been intended to permanently disable the software.

Clark Development Company went bankrupt in July 1997 and closed its offices without prior warning, leaving a great number of upset customers behind. Customers were never notified by the company, and customers who had just purchased licences for the software were not notified, refunded or provided access to the software they had paid for.

PCBoard after CDC

Sysops continued to use PCBoard around the world, even after support by CDC stopped when the company went out of business. Help was available from many individuals who created tools and documentation for the PCBoard system.

The company did not exist anymore when the Year 2000 problem, also known as the Y2K problem or millennium bug, made headline news. However, PCBoard only had a few minor problems with the year 2000 (and 2001) and fixes were made available by several individuals.

The last full release version of PCBoard, version 15.3, never really caught on and most systems that were online after 1997 continued to use the previous 15.2x versions of the software.

PCBoard is still in use today by nostalgic BBS fans. There is a freeware FOSSIL driver called NetFoss which allows PCBoard to be accessible via telnet under Windows. There was also a DOS based PCBoard add-on "PCB Internet Collection" which allowed telnet access by installing a (DOS-only) packet driver.

Awards

PCBoard programming language / PPLC compiler
1994 - Dvorak Award for "Outstanding PC Telecommunications Technology"

BBS Software
1995 - PC Magazine Editors Choice Award (August 1995 Issue)
1995 - Dvorak Award for "Best OS/2-based BBS software"
1997 - Inducted (Clark Development) into the Shareware Hall of Fame in 1997 by the SIAF board

Features
Packet switch support
Full Internationalization of dates & code page
FOSSIL support for virtually any intelligent serial card(/M code)
File attachment to messages
Multiple daily events
Full support for 2 byte international character sets
Built-in .QWK message packet support
Jukebox & "slow" CD-ROM support
Incoming fax support
Carbon-copy list support
Return receipt message support
Caller-ID support
ALIAS support by conference area
RIPscrip support for remote callers
PPL (PCBoard programming language compiler) (optional)
Automatic 16550 UART recognition & support
Intelligent & non-intelligent multi-port serial card support
Full screen text editor
ANSI graphics support
Full color operation
Thread reading of messages
Supports up to 65,535 conference (message base) areas
36 file transfer protocols supported
Supports 32,767 DOORS per conference
Real-time 255 channel node chat (CB chat)
Long message headers for all NetMail programs including Internet, Usenet & others.
Local network logins for in-house e-mail support
Direct connect support for in-house serial networks & PADS
Communicates directly with OS/2 COMM drivers to allow large number of multiple nodes under OS/2
Automatically detects OS/2 operation for time-slice control
Full network support for any NetBIOS compatible network, including NetWare, LANtastic, 3-Com, Vines & more.
Full remote DOS access for SysOp if desired
True & complete multi-lingual language support

Requirements
IBM PC compatible
Minimum 320k RAM
DOS 3.1 or higher
Modem to support remote dial-in, a Virtual Modem such as NetSerial, or the NetFoss telnet FOSSIL for Windows.

PCBoard/M
Needs 80386 CPU or higher since code is written using 80386 instructions for maximum speed.

PPLC versions
PCBoard V15.00 PPLC V1.00
PCBoard V15.10 PPLC V2.00
PCBoard V15.20 PPLC V3.00
PCBoard V15.21 PPLC V3.10
PCBoard V15.22 PPLC V3.20
PCBoard V15.30 PPLC V3.30
PCBoard V15.40 PPLC V3.40 (both beta)

PPE/PPL groups
Thousands of PPEs were developed and published, often available free of charge, by individuals or scene groups. A number of commercial PPEs were also developed, mostly under shareware licensing. A number of release groups who were specialized in PPE and other PCB/BBS tool developments were formed, such as the French group Aegis Corp, the Russian group Brutal PPE/PCE/PRO Coders (BPC) and the German groups Peanuts (PNS) and Paranoia (PNA).

Warez groups Such as PWA and DOD released several PPEs which were used by many sysops, including the PWA "NewScan" PPE, the PWA "Files-Reverse" PPE and the DOD "LARS Upload Processor".

The French group Aegis Corp distributed a PPE De-compiler (PPLX) written by Lone Runner, which allowed the de-compilation of PPE binaries back to human-readable PPL code. Lone Runner also wrote the Aegis PPL compiler, which produced smaller and faster code than Clark Development's original PPL compiler. Other tools for PPE developers followed. Another PPE De-compiler was PPLDecompiler (PPLD) written by CHiCKEN, a member of the "Swiss Coding Division" of the group Electronic Rats (EcR).

PCBoard Metaworlds
Metaworlds was an attempt by CDC to establish a BBS-like environment on the Internet, basically a closed mailbox in HTML format online. Access to the content was only possible for registered users who had to authenticate themselves with username and password to access the system. Metaworlds supported the parallel operation with the standard ANSI based PCBoard BBS software and used Microsoft SQL Server as underlying database. A runtime-version of Microsoft SQL Server came with the Metaworlds software. CDC went out of business before Metaworlds was finished. Metaworlds was developed by CDC to make the transition to the Internet when the decline of the BBS became apparent.

See also
 FILE_ID.DIZ (for DESC.SDI files)

References

External links
Brief history of PCBoard from bbsdocumentary.com (and software downloads)
153 PCBoard PPE's by PWA at The BBS Archive
PCboard File Archive A-C (556 PPE's), D-F (333 PPE's),  G-I (188 PPE's), J-O (358 PPE's), P-R (354 PPE's), S-Z (337 PPE's)  at The BBS Archive
PCBoard file archive,Filegate.net
DOS BBS software, Mpoli.fi
Sysop's corner list of PCB related sites
Original Install Disks and Collection of over 4,000 PPE's & Tools

Bulletin board system software
DOS software
OS/2 software
1983 software